Happy Are Those in Love is the second album by Hong Kong Cantopop singer Shirley Kwan, released on 1 November 1989. The title track was one of the biggest hits in 1989 and propelled Kwan into early stardom.

Track listing

References

External links
 http://www.espace.org/albums/c02/c02.html
 https://web.archive.org/web/20091028150829/http://geocities.com/bigheadphonemusic/female/shirley_kwan/index.htm

1989 albums
Shirley Kwan albums
PolyGram albums